Events from the year 1924 in France.

Incumbents
President: Alexandre Millerand (until 13 June), Gaston Doumergue (starting 13 June)
President of the Council of Ministers: 
 until 8 June: Raymond Poincare
 8 June-15 June: Frédéric François-Marsal
 starting 15 June: Édouard Herriot

Events
28 March – Total S.A. established as Compagnie française des pétroles.
29 March – Third Ministry of Raymond Poincaré starts.
27 April – Group of Alawites kill some Christian nuns in Syria; French troops march against them.
11 May – Legislative Election held.
25 May – Legislative Election held.
18 August – France begins to withdraw its troops from Germany.

Sport
25 January–4 February – The 1924 Winter Olympics open in Chamonix (in the French Alps), inaugurating the Winter Olympic Games.
4 May–27 July – The 1924 Summer Olympics are held in Paris.
22 June – Tour de France begins.
20 July – Tour de France ends, won by Ottavio Bottecchia of Italy.
10–17 August – The 1924 Summer Deaflympics take place in Paris.

Births

January to June
10 January – Pierre Plateau, Roman Catholic prelate (died 2018)
11 January – Roger Guillemin, neuroendocrinologist, awarded Nobel prize for medicine in 1977
13 January – Raymond Hermantier, actor (died 2005)
16 January – Henri-Jean Martin, historian of the book and printing (died 2007)
19 January – Jean-François Revel, politician, journalist, author and philosopher (died 2006).
23 January – Pierre Lacoste, admiral (died 2020)
13 February – Jean-Jacques Servan-Schreiber, journalist and politician (died 2006)
20 February – Laurent Dauthuille, boxer (died 1971)
23 February – Claude Sautet, author and film director (died 2000)
5 March – Roger Marche, international soccer player (died 1997)
13 March – Pierre Arpaillange, French author, senior judge and Government Minister (died 2017)
7 April
André du Bouchet, poet (died 2001)
Daniel Emilfork, actor (died 2006)
12 April – Raymond Barre, politician and economist, Prime Minister (died 2007)
29 April
Annette Chalut, Resistance worker and doctor
Zizi Jeanmaire, ballerina, actress and singer (died 2020)
7 May – Marcel Moussy, screenwriter and television director (died 1995)
17 May – Marie-Thérèse Cheroutre, historian and professor of philosophy (died 2020)
22 May
Charles Aznavour, singer-songwriter and actor (died 2018)
Claude Ballif, composer (died 2004)
12 June – Jacques Pras, cyclist (died 1982)
15 June – Paul Amargier, historian and Catholic priest (died 2021)

July to September
1 July – Georges Rivière, French actor 
9 July – Pierre Cochereau, organist and composer (died 1984)
17 July – Françoise Adnet, painter (died 2014)
7 August – Georges Lévis, comic artist (died 1988)
8 August – Edouard Jaguer, poet and art critic (died 2006)
10 August – Jean-François Lyotard, philosopher and literary theorist (died 1998)
13 August – Josette Arène, swimmer (died 2019) 
14 August – Georges Prêtre, conductor (died 2017)
17 August – Jean-Paul Alata, political prisoner in Camp Boiro, Guinea (January 1971-July 1975) (died 1978)
29 August – Guy Deplus, clarinetist (died 2020)
11 September – Louis Hon, soccer player (died 2008)
18 September – Antonin Rolland, road cycling racer
19 September – Jacques Lusseyran, author (died 1971)

October to December
2 October – Gilbert Simondon, philosopher (died 1989)
27 October – Alain Bombard, biologist, physician, politician and sailor (died 2005)
30 October – Hubert Curien, physicist (died 2005)
5 November – Alice Colonieu, artist (died 2000)
20 November – Michael Riffaterre, literary critic and theorist (died 2006).
26 November – Fernand Cazenave, international rugby union player and coach (died 2005)
13 December – Pierre Flamion, soccer player and manager (died 2004)

Full date unknown
Michel Alaux, fencing master and Olympic gold medallist (died 1974)

Deaths
24 January – Auguste-Louis-Albéric, prince d'Arenberg, noble and politician (born 1837)
17 March – Victor Besaucèle, ornithologist (born 1847)
14 April – Roland Bonaparte, prince, president of the Société de Géographie (born 1858)
24 April – Ferdinand Arnodin, engineer and industrialist (born 1845)
15 May – Paul-Henri-Benjamin d'Estournelles de Constant, diplomat and politician, recipient of the Nobel Peace Prize (born 1852)
11 June – Théodore Dubois, composer and organist (born 1837)
1 September – Gabriel Paul Othenin de Cléron, comte d'Haussonville, politician and author (born 1843)
21 September – Edouard Deville, first to perfect a practical method of photogrammetry (born 1849)
24 September – Alexandre Lacassagne, physician and criminologist (born 1843)
12 October – Anatole France, author, awarded Nobel Prize for Literature in 1921 (born 1844)
22 October – Louis-Émile Bertin, naval engineer (born 1840)
23 October – Marguerite de Witt-Schlumberger, feminist campaigner (born 1853)
4 November – Gabriel Fauré, composer, organist and pianist (born 1845)

Full date unknown
Jean Pierre Philippe Lampué, photographer (born 1836)

See also
 List of French films of 1924

References

1920s in France